The 2019 Asian Women's Volleyball Championship  was the twentieth edition of the Asian Women's Volleyball Championship, a biennial international volleyball tournament organised by the Asian Volleyball Confederation (AVC) with Korea Volleyball Association (KVA). The tournament was held in Seoul, South Korea, from 18 to 25 August 2019. South Korea played host to this event for the very first time. The top eight teams of this tournament qualified for the 2020 AVC Women's Volleyball Olympic Qualification Tournament.

Qualification
Following the AVC regulations, The maximum of 16 teams in all AVC events were selected by:
 1 team for the organizer
 10 teams based on the rankings of the previous championship
 5 teams from each of 5 zones (with a qualification tournament if needed)

Qualified teams

 South Korea qualified as the hosts and was originally top 10 of previous edition. The spot was reallocated to the 11th-ranked team, Hong Kong.
 Philippines originally qualified, but declined to enter. The spot was reallocated to the next highest ranked nation, New Zealand.
 SEAZVA was originally allocated one team, but WAZVA declined to enter. The spot was reallocated to Indonesia and Singapore.
 CEAZVA was originally allocated one team, but WAZVA declined to enter. The spot was reallocated to India and Sri Lanka.

Venues

Pools composition

Preliminary round
Teams were seeded in the first two positions of each pool following the Serpentine system according to their previous edition. AVC reserved the right to seed the hosts as heads of pool A regardless of the previous ranking. All teams not seeded were drawn to take other available positions in the remaining lines. Each pool had no more than three teams from the same zonal association. The draw was held in Bangkok, Thailand on 19 February 2019.

Ranking from the 2017 Asian Women's Volleyball Championship was shown in brackets except the host (who ranked third) and the teams who did not participate, which were denoted by (–).

Draw

Pool standing procedure
 Number of matches won
 Match points
 Sets ratio
 Points ratio
 Result of the last match between the tied teams

Match won 3–0 or 3–1: 3 match points for the winner, 0 match points for the loser
Match won 3–2: 2 match points for the winner, 1 match point for the loser

Preliminary round
All times are Korea Standard Time (UTC+09:00).

Pool A

|}

Pool B

|}

Pool C

|}

Pool D

|}

Second round

Pool E

|}

Pool F

|}

Pool G

|}

Pool H

|}

Final round

9th–12th Classification round

9th–12th semifinals

|}

11th place match

|}

9th place match

|}

5th–8th Classification round

5th–8th semifinals

|}

7th place match

|}

5th place match

|}

Final four

Semifinals

|}

3rd place match

|}

Final

|}

Final standings

Setter: Nanami Seki, Tamaki Matsui
Middle Blocker: Mai Irisawa, Nichika Yamada, Shion Hirayama, Kotomi Osaka
Outside Hitters: Miwako Osanai, Yuri Yoshino, Mayu Ishikawa, Yuki Nishikawa
Opposite: Miyu Nakagawa, Haruna Soga
Libero: Rena Mizusugi, Minami Nishimura

Awards

Most Valuable Player	
 Mayu Ishikawa
Best Setter
 Nootsara Tomkom
Best Outside Spikers
 Mayu Ishikawa
 Kim Yeon-koung

Best Middle Blockers
 Nichika Yamada
 Yang Hanyu
Best Opposite Spiker
 Haruna Soga
Best Libero
 Piyanut Pannoy

Qualifying teams for 2020 Asian Women's Olympic Qualification Tournament

See also
2019 Asian Men's Volleyball Championship
2019 Asian Women's U23 Volleyball Championship
2019 Asian Women's Club Volleyball Championship

References

External links
Asian Volleyball Confederation – official website

Asian Women's Volleyball Championship
2019 in South Korean women's sport
2010s in Seoul
2019
International volleyball competitions hosted by South Korea
August 2019 sports events in South Korea